Gretchen Osgood Warren (19 March 1868 – 13 September 1961) was an American actress, singer and poet. She was  the wife of Fiske Warren. The daughter of Dr. Hamilton Osgood and Margaret Cushing Osgood of Beacon Hill, Boston, Massachusetts, her younger sister was Mary Alden Childers, the wife of writer and Irish nationalist Erskine Childers. Her nephew Erskine Hamilton Childers served as the fourth President of Ireland from 1973-74.

Early life
She could sing perfectly in pitch, write like an adult and recite poetry on command. Her upbringing in the affluent environment that was turn of the century Beacon Hill, Boston, Massachusetts allowed her to pursue music and drama to an extremely high level.

Just down the street from the Osgood home was the Boston Athenaeum, where a long line of Osgoods, namely Frances Sargent Osgood and Samuel Stillman Osgood, are all listed on the "Register of the Proprietors" for the institution. Gretchen went on to study at Oxford and graduated with honors.

Artistic muse

John Singer Sargent, the famed portraitist of Boston's elite, was commissioned by Warren's husband, Fiske Warren to paint her portrait in April 1903. The sitting was done in Fenway Court, then the home of legendary Boston fine arts czar; Isabella Stewart Gardner. Warren is seen seated in a chair with her daughter, Rachel Warren. The painting is often considered to be one of Sargent's prime portraits and usually appears in Sargent Estate calendars and postcards. Later she was also photographed by portrait photographer Arnold Genthe.

She died at her home in Boston in 1961. Her daughter Rachel married the American archaeologist Samuel K. Lothrop and later the Irish nationalist Robert Childers Barton.

Awards
 Golden Rose Award

Works

Humanity, by Gretchen Osgood Warren, (Basil Blackwell, Oxford) 1953 (A Selection of Poems)

References

Sources
The Mount Vernon Street Warrens, Martin Green, Simon & Schuster, 1989 
 Museum of Fine Arts, Boston

1868 births
1961 deaths
Actresses from Boston
American women poets
American art collectors
People from Beacon Hill, Boston